Ashkan-e Olya (also Romanized as Ashkān-e ‘Olyā; also known as Ashkān-e Bālā) is a village in Alan Rural District, in the Central District of Sardasht County, West Azerbaijan Province, Iran. At the 2006 census, its population was 89, in 24 families.

References 

Populated places in Sardasht County